Zinme Yazawin is an 18th-century Burmese chronicle that covers the history of Lan Na under Burmese rule (1558–1775). The first English translation of the chronicle was published in 2003.

References

Bibliography
 

Burmese chronicles
Lan Na
History of Chiang Mai